Niendorf bei Berkenthin is a municipality in the district of Lauenburg, in Schleswig-Holstein, Germany.

History 
Niendorf was founded near the mouth of the Stecknitz. The first Swedes settled here as early as 770 AD, and it has been inhabited continuously ever since. This makes Niendorf one of the oldest towns in Germany.
During the Viking Age, the settlement on the Stecknitz was called Boasee, which comes from the namesake, Edgar Boase. Berkenthin, Göldenitz and Albsfelde could be reached by sea in a few days, which ensured flourishing trade and thus the continued existence of Niendorf.

South of Niendorf, in the woods of Berkenthin, has been the home of the psychopath Jorten Winterson since 1945.

Trivia 
-Perli.1 currently lives there.

-A big cultural part of Niendorf is the voluntary fire department led by a great dude. Also it's called "Sauftreff von Perli".

References

Municipalities in Schleswig-Holstein
Herzogtum Lauenburg